Simon John Hiscocks (born 21 May 1973 in Dorking, Surrey) is a British sailor. He won a bronze medal for Great Britain at the 2004 Summer Olympics in the 49er. Hiscocks also won a silver medal at the 2000 Summer Olympics in the same category.
Hiscocks has been racing in the America's cup for the GreenCom Team.

He lives in Portland, Dorset and has two children, Amelie and Louis.

He is the founder of Shock Sailing, who manufacture parts for high performance sailboats, perform boat repairs, broker the sale of new and used dinghies, and manufacture sailing accessories. Since his Olympic career, Hiscocks has been prominent in the Foiling Moth class, and in other high performance skiffs.

References

External links
 
 
 

Living people
Olympic sailors of Great Britain
British male sailors (sport)
Olympic silver medallists for Great Britain
Olympic bronze medallists for Great Britain
Sailors at the 2000 Summer Olympics – 49er
Sailors at the 2004 Summer Olympics – 49er
Medalists at the 2004 Summer Olympics
1973 births
49er class world champions
Medalists at the 2000 Summer Olympics
Green Comm Racing sailors
World champions in sailing for Great Britain
Olympic medalists in sailing